The 1986 NCAA Division I baseball tournament was played at the end of the 1986 NCAA Division I baseball season to determine the national champion of college baseball.  The tournament concluded with eight teams competing in the College World Series, a double-elimination tournament in its fortieth year.  Eight regional competitions were held to determine the participants in the final event.  Four regions held a four team, double-elimination tournament while the remaining four regions included six teams, resulting in 40 teams participating in the tournament at the conclusion of their regular season, and in some cases, after a conference tournament.  The fortieth tournament's champion was Arizona, coached by Jerry Kindall.  The Most Outstanding Player was Mike Senne of Arizona.

National seeds
Bold indicates CWS participant.

Florida State
LSU
Miami (FL)
Texas
UCLA

Regionals
The opening rounds of the tournament were played across eight regional sites across the country, four consisting of four teams and four of six teams. The winners of each Regional advanced to the College World Series.

Bold indicates winner.

Atlantic Regional at Coral Gables, FL

Central Regional at Austin, TX

Mideast Regional at Ann Arbor, MI

Midwest Regional at Stillwater, OK

Northeast Regional at Orono, ME

South I Regional at Baton Rouge, LA

South II Regional at Tallahassee, FL

West Regional at Los Angeles, CA

College World Series

Participants

Results

Bracket

Game results

All-Tournament Team
The following players were members of the All-Tournament Team.

Notable players
 Arizona: Chip Hale, Gil Heredia, Tommy Hinzo
 Florida State: Luis Alicea, Bien Figueroa, Richie Lewis, Mike Loynd, Paul Sorrento
 Indiana State: Mike Gardiner
 Loyola Marymount:  Chris Donnels, Billy Bean, Tim Layana
 LSU: Albert Belle, Jeff Yurtin,  Jim Bowie, Mark Guthrie, Barry Manuel, Jeff Reboulet, Jack Voigt
 Maine: Mike Bordick, Jeff Plympton
 Miami (FL): Chris Howard, Greg Vaughn
 Oklahoma State:  Jeff Bronkey, Gordon Dillard, Monty Fariss, Tim Pugh, Robin Ventura, Scott Wilkinson

Tournament notes 

 In the Central Regional Arizona sets a tournament record scoring 26 runs in the first game.

See also
 1986 NCAA Division I softball tournament
 1986 NCAA Division II baseball tournament
 1986 NCAA Division III baseball tournament
 1986 NAIA World Series

References

NCAA Division I Baseball Championship
1986 NCAA Division I baseball season
NCAA Division I Baseball
Baseball in Austin, Texas